The Thin Red Line may refer to:

Arts and entertainment
 The Thin Red Line (painting), an 1881 painting of the Battle of Balaclava by Robert Gibb
 The Thin Red Line (novel), a 1962 novel by James Jones
 The Thin Red Line (1964 film), a film by Andrew Marton based on Jones's novel
 The Thin Red Line (1998 film), a film by Terrence Malick based on Jones's novel
 The Thin Red Line (soundtrack), a soundtrack album from the 1998 film
 The Thin Red Line (album), a 1986 album by Glass Tiger, or the title track
 "The Thin Red Line" (The Mentalist), a television episode
 "The Thin Red Line", 1966 episode of the British television show Gideon's Way

Military
 The Thin Red Line (Battle of Balaclava), an 1854 military action during the Crimean War
 Argyll and Sutherland Highlanders, a military unit nicknamed the Thin Red Line
 Regimental marches of the British Army, of the Argyll and Sutherland Highlanders

Other uses
 The Thin Red Line, an emblem representing the camaraderie of firefighters.  A similar emblem used for law enforcement, see The Thin Blue Line
 "The Thin Red Line", a song by Saxon from Unleash the Beast

See also
 Red Line (disambiguation)
 The Thin Blue Line (disambiguation)
 The Thin Yellow Line, a 2015 Mexican film